Montgomery Bell Academy (MBA) is a preparatory day school for boys in grades 7 through 12 in Nashville, Tennessee. The school is located in the Whitland Area Neighborhood.

History

MBA was established in 1867 in the aftermath of the American Civil War. It is the successor to two schools: the Western Military Institute, which Sam Davis, the "Boy Hero of the Confederacy", attended, and the former University of Nashville. The school's board operates under the corporate title, "Board of Trustees of the University of Nashville", although the university was disbanded in 1909.

From 1870 to 1875, former Confederate general Edmund Kirby Smith was the chancellor of the University of Nashville, which comprised both a two-year college operating as the University of Nashville, and MBA, the preparatory high school and grammar school. In 1875, a financial crisis and a donation from the Peabody Fund caused an organizational separation of the university and the preparatory school. The university used the proceeds of the Peabody Fund and was operated under a new board of trustees under the name of Peabody Normal College, later called the George Peabody College for Teachers. The board of trustees of the University of Nashville continued to operate MBA as a preparatory school.

From about 1880 until 1915, the school operated across University Street from the campus of the former University of Nashville. In 1915, the school bought a West End Avenue estate known as Totomoi from the Tinsley family, and the campus moved soon after.  

The military nature of one of the predecessors notwithstanding, under its current name it has always operated as a civilian institution, and as a day school rather than a boarding school. The school is named in honor of Montgomery Bell, a Pennsylvania native who made his fortune as the early 19th century "ironmaster" of Middle Tennessee and whose will endowed it, with the stipulation that it forever be an all-male institution.

In the 1970s, the school's enrollment surged as white parents withdrew their children from racially integrated public schools. In 1980, the headmaster Michael Drake told a newspaper "Every time the court rules in the Metro desegregation case, our enrollment goes way up."

Campus and resources

Montgomery Bell Academy's campus consists of eight academic and administrative buildings, a gymnasium, and numerous on-campus athletic facilities.

Montgomery Bell Academy also owns and operates a 24' telescope in McMinnville, Tennessee at Long Mountain. This site is noted for having the least ambient light in the Southeastern United States, making conditions favorable for astrophotography. Annually, the Montgomery Bell Academy faculty and student body journey to the facility to hold the school's annual Leadership Retreat. On the facility grounds, there are two football fields, a lake, a high ropes course, and a low ropes course. The main feature of the campus (besides the observatory) is the large cliff to the west of the building. Students are challenged each year to rappel down the cliff and climb up the cliff as well. On occasion, the school's climbing club comes to the facility to practice all-natural rock climbing.

In 2011, Montgomery Bell Academy added the new Lowry Building in late December. In 2012, the school's new building, the Wallace Building, was completed. In addition to these new structures, a geothermal heating and cooling system was added. The school has also constructed new, porous parking lots to facilitate the new irrigation system.

Montgomery Bell Academy also has exchange links with other boys' schools throughout the English-speaking world; these include Eton College and Winchester College in England, Kearsney College and Michaelhouse in South Africa, and The Southport School, The King's School, Parramatta and, most recently, Melbourne Grammar School in Australia, Christ's College, Christchurch in New Zealand and The Raffles Institution in Singapore. Winchester College and Eton College are similar to MBA through discipline, dress code, and having an all-male student body.

Notable individuals who have spoken to the student body include Michael Crichton, Ted Turner, Charles Townes, and Robert Orr, Jr.

A statue of Sam Davis was installed on the school grounds, until 2020.

In 2019, MBA began construction of a new 200,000 square foot athletic and wellness center. It was scheduled to open in early 2021.

Athletics
Montgomery Bell Academy's sport offerings include football, basketball, baseball, soccer, and lacrosse.

The school has won the Tennessee Secondary School Athletic Association's football championship fourteen times, from 1915 to 2014.

The school has also gained recognition for its Cross Country team. Since its inception in 1995, the team has claimed a total of thirteen state championships. Most notably, the team claimed a perfect sweep in the state championship of 2010, in which all top five places were claimed by the school's runners.

The school's tennis team was able to claim the state title of 2013 over the Gulliver Preparatory School by a margin of 5-to-4. The team also hosts its own tennis tournament each spring, entitled the Francis Carter Invitational.

The MBA Soccer Program is led by the former Coach of Waterford United (Irish Premier League), Giles Cheevers. MBA Soccer captured the 2015 TSSAA Tennessee State Soccer Championship (DII-AA) with a 3-0 win over Christian Brothers High School (CBHS).

Debate and forensics
In addition to its academics programs, Montgomery Bell Academy has a separate debate and forensics program. The school offers Policy Debate to its students.

Annually, Montgomery Bell Academy hosts its speech and debate tournament, the Southern Bell Forum. The tournament has a unique ranking system, where speaker points are accounted for in the final ranking system.

Visual and Performing arts

The Montgomery Bell Academy theater program has won awards at the Tennessee Theater Association. The school also performs its annual student-directed one-acts in April and May, where it invites the students to write and direct their original scripts. MBA also performs its annual musical with students from the Harpeth Hall School. The high school orchestra is known as the MBA Sinfonia.

In popular culture
Montgomery Bell Academy graduate Thomas Schulman, class of 1968, wrote the screenplay for the 1989 motion picture Dead Poets Society,  which depicts a  fictional school patterned after Montgomery Bell Academy. Robin Williams portrayed a character based on Sam Pickering, one of Schulman's teachers during his years at Montgomery Bell Academy.

Notable alumni

Lt. Gen. Frank Maxwell Andrews, aviation pioneer, World War II European commander, Andrews Air Force Base namesake
Will Bartholomew NFL fullback
Ridley Wills II, author, historian
 Jere Baxter, railroad entrepreneur
Robin Beard, former member of U.S. House of Representatives
David Briley, former Mayor of Nashville, TN
Madison Smartt Bell, novelist
Ty Chandler, Running back for the Minnesota Vikings
R. A. Dickey, professional baseball pitcher and 2012 Cy Young Award winner
Jacob M. Dickinson, U.S. Secretary of War
Frank Drowota, former Chief Justice, Tennessee Supreme Court
Morgan Entrekin, Grove/Atlantic, Inc. president
J. Frederick Essary (1881-1942), journalist
Jesse Hill Ford, novelist
Bill Frist, former U.S. Senate Majority Leader
Thomas Frist, founder of Hospital Corporation of America
Brendan Kyle Hatcher, U.S. Diplomat
Hunter Hillenmeyer, Chicago Bears linebacker
John Jay Hooker, attorney, entrepreneur, politician
Joseph Toy Howell III, author
E. Bronson Ingram II, American businessman and billionaire
Madison Jones, novelist
Kevin M. Kruse, historian
 Oliver Kuhn, athlete
Alan LeQuire, sculptor
Ingle Martin, Football player (NFL Quarterback)
Penn Murfee, professional baseball pitcher for the Seattle Mariners
 Tom Neff, CEO and founder of The Documentary Channel
Samuel Pickering, essayist
Admiral Joseph W. Prueher, a former Commander-in-Chief of the U.S. Pacific Command and Ambassador to China.
Grantland Rice, early 20th-century American sportswriter
Tom Santi,  NFL tight end
Charles Sawyers, physician-scientist
Brandt Snedeker, PGA Tour Golfer
Thomas Schulman, author of Dead Poets Society
Richard Speight, Jr., actor
Bill Wade, NFL quarterback

References

 Parks, Joseph Howard, General Edmund Kirby Smith, CSA, LSU Press, 1954.

External links
MBA website
Boyd, Nannie Seawell, Collection of Papers Relating to Montgomery Bell, 1853-1939, Tennessee State Library and Archives

1866 establishments in Tennessee
Boys' schools in Tennessee
Educational institutions established in 1866
Preparatory schools in Tennessee
Private high schools in Tennessee
Private middle schools in Tennessee
Schools in Nashville, Tennessee